Basistriga is a genus of moths of the family Noctuidae.

Selected species
Basistriga flammatra Schiffermüller, 1775
Basistriga herculea Corti & Draudt, 1933

References
Basistriga at Markku Savela's Lepidoptera and Some Other Life Forms

Noctuinae